Mont Racine (1,439 m) is a peak in the Jura Mountains, located between La Sagne and Les Geneveys-sur-Coffrane in the canton of Neuchâtel.

References

External links
Mont Racine on Hikr

Mountains of the Jura
Mountains of the canton of Neuchâtel
Mountains of Switzerland
One-thousanders of Switzerland